Darrel Damoo (born 22 September 1989) is a Seychellois football striker who plays for The Lions FC. He was a squad member for the 2019 COSAFA Cup and the 2019 Indian Ocean Island Games.

References 

1989 births
Living people
Seychellois footballers
Northern Dynamo FC players
The Lions FC players
Seychelles international footballers
Association football forwards